Vera Yuryevna Rebrik (born 25 February 1989) is a Ukrainian track and field athlete who competes in the javelin throw. Her personal best throw is 67.30 metres, achieved at the Russian Championships in Adler. She also holds the world under-20 record of 63.01 metres.

From Yalta, Crimea, she competed for Ukraine until 2014, after which she transferred her eligibility to Russia, following the annexation of Crimea by the Russian Federation.

Due to Russia currently being suspended from all international athletic competitions, Rebrik participates as a neutral athlete.

International competitions

See also
List of European Athletics Championships medalists (women)

References

External links

sports-reference

1989 births
Living people
People from Yalta
People from the Crimean Oblast
Ukrainian female javelin throwers
Russian female javelin throwers
Olympic female javelin throwers
Olympic athletes of Ukraine
Athletes (track and field) at the 2008 Summer Olympics
Athletes (track and field) at the 2012 Summer Olympics
Universiade medalists in athletics (track and field)
Universiade silver medalists for Ukraine
Competitors at the 2011 Summer Universiade
Medalists at the 2009 Summer Universiade
World Athletics Championships athletes for Russia
World Athletics Championships athletes for Ukraine
Authorised Neutral Athletes at the World Athletics Championships
World Athletics U20 Championships winners
European Athletics Championships winners
European Athletics Championships medalists
Russian Athletics Championships winners
Russian people of Ukrainian descent
Ukrainian emigrants to Russia
Naturalised citizens of Russia